Guido de Brès Christian High School is a Christian high school in Hamilton, Ontario based on the Reformed denomination. It is a privately funded school run by the Guido de Brès Canadian Reformed School Society which was formed in 1974. The school is named after Guido de Brès, a Belgian Reformer who died as a martyr to the faith in 1567. He is the author of the Belgic Confession, one of the Three Forms of Unity for the Reformed churches. A statement from article 12 of this confession is inscribed on a wooden plaque in the front lobby and summarizes the school's vision: "to the end that man may serve his God." This plaque was presented to the school on the occasion of the building's official opening in October 1977. As of 2019, the school has over 400 students and 43 staff members. All courses are taught from a Reformed Christian perspective. The school motto is "Everything in Christ" to reflect this.

References
These are the references used:

External links
Guido de Bres Christian High School

Christian schools in Canada
High schools in Hamilton, Ontario